Faze was an American soul band of the 1980s and early 1990s from Miami, Florida. The band comprised Dave Johnson, Edward Faison, Robert Wright, Fernandez Cherry, and Wayne Morrison.

Their discography includes the albums Faze 1 (1989), Love Games (1991), Love Affairs (1995), and Cold Sweat Again (1997).

The group's "Cold Sweat" single charted twice on the Billboard Top R&B/Hip Hop Singles chart, peaking at no. 61 in 1989 and at no. 94 in 1991.

The group were described as "urban contemporary" and "dance-pop" by Allmusic reviewer Ron Wynn.

Discography

Albums
Faze 1 (1989), Cyntone
Love Games (1991), Bahia/RCA		
Love Affairs (1995), Urban Sterling Entertainment
Cold Sweat Again (1997), Grand Avenue

Singles
"When You Were Mine" (1989), Cyntone
"Cold Sweat" (1989), Cyntone
"Cold Sweat" (1991), Bahia
"That's What I'm Here For" (1991), Bahia
"The Things You Do" (1991), Bahia
"Keep It Goin'" (1995), Grand Avenue

References

American soul musical groups